The Borovë massacre occurred on July 6, 1943, in the village of Borovë, in southeastern Albania. German forces killed 107 civilians as a reprisal for a partisan attack on a German convoy in the village of Barmash.

Attack on the convoy
In July 1943 Albania was still under Italian occupation. The German forces of the 98th Regiment of the first Alpine Division which was based in Ioannina, Nazi occupied Greece were passing through Albania to regroup with the main forces in Greece. They entered the Albanian territory in the Korçë region from the Macedonia part of Yugoslavia. Before they could cross into Greek territory they were attacked in two different places near the village of Borovë by Albanian partisans of the Albanian National Liberation Movement, led by Riza Kodheli. After the battle, which lasted for several hours, the convoy was able to continue to its destination.  The Partisans inflicted heavy losses on the Germans, destroying most of the vehicles and military equipment and killing more than 60 men.

Reprisal

After the report of the attack a German expedition was sent from Greece to the place where the attack happened. In reprisal the German forces, armed with flame throwers, set every house in the village on fire. The German forces massacred all the inhabitants of the village of Borovë that they could find on that day. Some of the victims were killed in place while many were grouped inside the village church and burned alive. The death toll amounted to 107 civilians mostly old, children and women.

Legacy
In 1972, the Albanian composer Thoma Gaqi, wrote a symphonic poem, Borova, in commemoration of the victims.

See also
List of massacres in Albania

References

Sources

1943 in Albania
Nazi war crimes in Albania
Albania in World War II
Massacres in Albania
July 1943 events
War crimes of the Wehrmacht
Massacres committed by Nazi Germany
1943 crimes in Europe
Massacres in 1943